Cosimo Marco Da Graca (born 1 May 2002) is an Italian professional footballer who plays as a striker for  club Juventus Next Gen.

Club career

Youth career 
Da Graca began his youth career at Calcio Sicilia aged 10, before moving to Palermo's youth sector aged 12. He stayed there until 2018, when he moved to Juventus on loan, before making the move permanent in 2019 for €600,000.

Juventus 
On 28 October 2020, Da Graca made his Serie C debut for Juventus U23, the reserve team of Juventus, in a 2–1 defeat to Como. He scored his first goal for Juventus U23 on 7 March as a second-half substitute, scoring the game's sole goal in the 85th minute against Grosseto. He was first called up to the senior side on 2 December 2020, as an unused substitute in a UEFA Champions League group stage game against Dynamo Kyiv. Da Graca played his first game for Juventus on 27 January 2021, coming on as a substitute in a 4–0 win over SPAL in the Coppa Italia. On 15 April, Juventus renewed Da Graca's contract until June 2024.

Da Graca started the 2021–22 season with some muscular injuries. His debut in the season came on 24 October, coming on as substitute in the 71st minute in a 1–1 home draw against Pro Sesto; he also scored the equalizing goal in the 89th minute.  On 8 December, Da Graca made his UEFA Champions League debut in a 1–0 win against Malmö FF, coming on as substitute in the 89th minute. On 17 January 2022, Da Graca was ruled out for a month to undergo treatment after it was diagnosed that he suffered from an irregular heartbeat. Da Graca's first mach after his injury came on 23 February, in a match against Pro Patria won 1–0. On 12 May, he scored a 30th-minute decider in Juventus U23's 1–0 away win to Renate in the third round of play-offs, allowing his team to access the further round.

International career 
Eligible to represent Cape Verde through his father, Da Graca has played for Italy at youth level. He went on trial for the under-15s, before playing eight games for the under-16s in 2018.

Style of play 

Personal life 
Da Graca was born in Palermo, Italy, to a father from Praia, Cape Verde.

Career statistics

Club

Honours 
Juventus
 Coppa Italia: 2020–21

References

Notelist

External links 
 
 
 

2002 births
Living people
Footballers from Palermo
Italian people of Cape Verdean descent
Italian sportspeople of African descent
Cape Verdean people of Italian descent
Italian footballers
Association football forwards
Palermo F.C. players
Juventus F.C. players
Juventus Next Gen players
Serie C players
Italy youth international footballers